The Sin of Julia (Spanish:El pecado de Julia) is a 1946 Argentine drama film directed by Mario Soffici and starring Amelia Bence, Aída Luz and Alberto Closas.

It is an adaptation of August Strindberg's 1888 play Miss Julie. The film's sets were designed by the art director Gori Muñoz.

Cast
 Amelia Bence as La Señorita Julia 
 Aída Luz as Cristina 
 Alberto Closas as Juan  
 Milagros de la Vega as Karen  
 Alberto Contreras as Pedro  
 Carlos Lagrotta as Conrado  
 Diana Cortesina as Agatha  
 María Esther Emery 
 Juan Pecci 
 Chela Cordero 
 Diana Wells
 Ana Gryn 
 Jorge Villoldo
 José María Navarro 
 Pepita González 
 Antonio Moro
 Ricardo Monner Sáns
 Carlos Rivas

References

Bibliography 
 Ricardo García Oliveri. Cine argentino: crónica de 100 años. Manrique Zago Ediciones, 1997.

External links 
 

1946 films
1946 drama films
Films based on works by August Strindberg
Argentine drama films
1940s Spanish-language films
Films directed by Mario Soffici
Films scored by Alejandro Gutiérrez del Barrio
Films with screenplays by Tulio Demicheli
Argentine black-and-white films
Works based on Miss Julie
1940s Argentine films